Johan Olofsson (born May 9, 1994) is a Swedish professional ice hockey player who is currently playing for the Malmö Redhawks in the Swedish Hockey League (SHL). He made his Elitserien debut playing with Färjestad BK during the 2012–13 Elitserien season.

Career statistics

References

External links

1994 births
AIK IF players
Färjestad BK players
Leksands IF players
Living people
Malmö Redhawks players
Swedish ice hockey right wingers